James Leasor (20 December 1923 – 10 September 2007) was a prolific British author, who wrote historical books and thrillers. A number of Leasor's works were made into films, including his 1978 book, Boarding Party, about an incident from the Second World War that until that time was secret, which was turned into The Sea Wolves (1980) starring Gregory Peck, Roger Moore and David Niven.

Biography

Leasor was born in Erith, Kent, in 1923, and was educated at the City of London School.

On leaving school, whilst waiting to join the army, he had his first foray into journalism as a cub scout reporter for the Kent Messenger. As soon as he was old enough, he enlisted into the Buffs (Royal East Kent Regiment). He was then commissioned into the Royal Berkshire Regiment and volunteered for service in the Far East, where he served in Burma with the Lincolnshire Regiment during World War II. Whilst serving with the Lincolns he saw action in the Battle of the Admin Box. In the Far East, whilst sailing in convoy HC-44 from Calcutta to Chittagong, his troopship, the El Madina, was torpedoed on 16 March 1944  and he spent 18 hours adrift in the Indian Ocean. Ten crew, six gunners and 364 troops perished in the incident.

He wrote his first book, Not Such a Bad Day, by hand in the jungles of Burma on airgraphs, single sheets of light-sensitive paper which could be reduced to the size of microdots and flown to England in their thousands to be blown up to full size again. His mother then typed it up and sent it off to an agent, who found a publisher who sold 28,000 copies, although Leasor received just £50 for all its rights.  He was wounded in action (injuries from a shell) on 8 May 1944, in the Arakan, and treated at 25 Indian Casualty Clearing Station. In November 1944 he left Burma to become a sub-editor of Contact, a bi-weekly newspaper for the forces of India Command in Delhi and South East Asia Command, under the inspirational editorship of Frank Owen.  He returned to Burma as an Army Observer for the 12th Army, then in Rangoon. In February 1946 he was transferred to HQ Malaya Command in Kuala Lumpur. During his time as an observer, he travelled throughout Burma, Malaya, the Shan States and the Andaman Islands by plane and jeep. He reckoned that he had visited practically every town in these regions by the time he returned to the UK in mid-1946. His official record shows that he wrote over 300 news stories on the Burma campaign, and also contributed features for the BBC, All India Radio, as well as for virtually every British national newspaper. His novel, NTR: Nothing to Report, is a semi-autobiographical account of some of his experiences in India and Burma during the war.

After the war, he went to Oriel College, Oxford, where he read English and edited The Isis magazine. He joined the Express after university and soon became private secretary to Lord Beaverbrook, the proprietor of the newspaper, and then a foreign correspondent.

He first came to notice as an author with a number of critically acclaimed histories. These included The Red Fort, his account of the Indian Mutiny, on which Cecil Woodham-Smith commented in the New York Times: "Never has this story of hate, violence, courage and cowardice been better told"; The One That Got Away, about the only German prisoner of war, Franz von Werra, to escape from Allied territory during World War 2, which was later filmed starring Hardy Kruger; The Plague and the Fire, about London's twin tragedies in the 17th century; The Millionth Chance about the loss of the R101 airship; and Singapore: The Battle that Changed the World, on the Battle of Singapore in 1942.

He became a full-time author in the 1960s, after the success of his novel Passport to Oblivion, one of the best selling books of the 1960s, a thriller featuring Dr Jason Love. The story was filmed as Where the Spies Are in 1965 starring David Niven. An audio version of Passport to Oblivion was produced and released in 2019 starring George Lazenby as Dr Jason Love. He wrote nine more thrillers featuring Jason Love, as well a string of other novels. He continued to write historical books, and later titles included Green Beach, about the Dieppe Raid in 1975; Boarding Party in 1978, which was filmed as The Sea Wolves, based on the real events of Operation Creek; The Unknown Warrior, about an agent who was a major part of the D-Day deception plans; Who Killed Sir Harry Oakes?, made into a TV mini-series in 1989, called Passion and Paradise, starring Armand Assante, Catherine Mary Stewart, Mariette Hartley and Kevin McCarthy, with Rod Steiger playing Sir Harry Oakes; and Rhodes and Barnato, which examined the lives of two men, Cecil Rhodes and Barney Barnato, who were major figures in the history of South Africa. This was his final book, published in 1997.

He wrote a number of books under the pseudonym Andrew MacAllan, and ghosted a number of 'autobiographies' for people as diverse as King Zog of Albania, and British actors Kenneth More and Jack Hawkins.

He had a great interest in cars, and owned some pre-war specimens such as a rare Cord roadster, which appeared in the Jason Love novels, and an SS Jaguar 100 which featured in his Aristo Autos series.

Leasor married barrister Joan Bevan on 1 December 1951 and they had three sons. He lived for his last 40 years at Swallowcliffe Manor, near Salisbury in Wiltshire. He died in Salisbury on 10 September 2007, aged 83, and is buried in the churchyard of St. Peter's Church in Swallowcliffe.

Andrew MacAllan

Anecdotally the pseudonym 'Andrew MacAllan' was conceived by Leasor and his literary agent, Gillon Aitken, during a long lunch. Leasor was now in his sixties and finding it harder to interest publishers in new book projects. They were happy to publish some of his proven successes, such the Jason Love thrillers – but even then they would limit their print runs to 20,000 in hardback, which would virtually all be snapped up by libraries. They would then say that few had been sold to retailers and that therefore there was no popular demand for a larger run.

Leasor was also frustrated by people accosting him at drinks parties claiming that it was now virtually impossible for a new author to get published on merit alone, without some fashionable backstory to excite the publisher’s interest. Aitken and Leasor wanted to overcome these obstacles. But how could a ‘new’ author get a book published without revealing who he was? Their idea involved an author who, with a credible reason, was unable to meet the publisher.

The narrative was developed that MacAllan was a successful businessman based in the Far East, but who, because of the nature of his work, travelled frequently. He would be hard to tie to any particular location or schedule. All contact would be via the agent – Gillon Aitken.

Leasor wrote the first three chapters and a synopsis of an epic historical saga, loosely based on the origins of Hong Kong-based trading companies like Jardine Matheson and Swire. Gillon Aitken took it, along with the agreed story about MacAllan, around a number of London-based publishers. It was snapped up by the fairly recently-launched – and very ambitious – Headline Publishing Group, with a healthy advance.

During his travels around the world, Leasor had collected hotel headed writing paper from various places, and 'MacAllan' used these to correspond with the publisher. He was introduced to a branch manager of the Royal Bank of Scotland in Pall Mall, who agreed to open a bank account in the name of Andrew MacAllan, so any royalty payments could be paid without arising suspicion; the bank could also act as a forwarding address.

The first book, Succession, a 700 page blockbuster, was published in 1989 and sold well. An initial print run of 50,000 in hardback quickly sold out, and reprints swiftly followed, making it Headline's biggest seller that year. A sequel, Generation, came out the following year, and similar sales success resulted.

The pressure from the publishers for them to meet their star author became overwhelming. Who was this unknown writer who could so effortlessly turn out bestsellers, with supposedly no previous experience? Numerous meetings had been scheduled, and then cancelled at short notice due to 'MacAllan's hectic travel schedule. But Aitken and Leasor realised that this could not go on for ever – and so they revealed everything to Headline. Headline, now part of the Hachette publishing group, published four more MacAllan bestsellers, Diamond Hard, Fanfare, Speculator and Traders.

Bibliography

Jason Love novels

 Published in the U.S. as 
 Published in the U.S. as

Jason Love and Aristo Autos novel

Aristo Autos novels

Robert Gunn novels

Other novels

Leasor, J. (1946). Not Such a Bad Day.

As Andrew MacAllan (novels)

Short stories
 Leasor, J. At Rest at Last - first published in The Rigby File (1989), ed. Tim Heald

Non-fiction

 Republished in paperback 1980 as The Sea Wolves with a special foreword by Lord Mountbatten of Burma.
 Republished in paperback as

See also
Calcutta Light Horse
List of films based on war books

References

External links
 

British thriller writers
British historical novelists
English thriller writers
Alumni of Oriel College, Oxford
Royal Lincolnshire Regiment officers
People educated at the City of London School
1923 births
2007 deaths
People from Erith
English male novelists
20th-century English novelists
20th-century English male writers